Michael Peter Coward (26 June 1945 – 16 July 2003) was an English geologist who did research on "thin-skinned" tectonics.

Coward studied geology at Imperial College London. He was H. H. Read Professor of Geology at Imperial College, Council Member of the Geological Society of London, and Chair of the UK Tectonic Studies Group. He received The Murchison Fund award in 1980.

In his honour the Geological Society published Deformation of the Continental Crust: The Legacy of Mike Coward in 2007.

References

External links
Continental Tectonics: A Discussion Meeting in memory and celebration of the life and work of Mike Coward
Mike Coward Prize

1945 births
2003 deaths
20th-century British geologists
People from Farnworth
Alumni of Imperial College London
Academics of Imperial College London